Jakovlje is a municipality in Croatia, in Zagreb County. According to the 2011 census there are 3,930 inhabitants, a majority of which are Croats. The municipality consists of three settlements: Igrišće, Jakovlje and Kraljev Vrh.

References

External links

Populated places in Zagreb County
Zaprešić
Municipalities of Croatia